Alexander Ludwig (born May 7, 1992) is a Canadian actor and country musician. He first began his career as a child, and then received recognition as a teenager for starring in the films The Seeker: The Dark Is Rising (2007) and Race to Witch Mountain (2009). He is also known for starring as Cato in The Hunger Games (2012).

He is also known for his supporting roles as Shane Patton in Lone Survivor (2013), and Dorn in Bad Boys for Life (2020). He starred as legendary Viking Björn Ironside in the History Channel series Vikings (2014–2020). He currently stars on the series Heels. As a musician, Ludwig released his debut album Highway 99 via BBR Music Group on August 26, 2022.

Early life
Ludwig was born in Vancouver, British Columbia, Canada, to Sharlene (née Martin), a former actress, and Harald Horst Ludwig, a businessman and former co-chair of Lionsgate Entertainment. He has three younger siblings. Ludwig was drawn to the profession, saying in an interview, "I have a big imagination. I love performing." 

Despite his mother's early career as an actress, Ludwig had to convince his parents to support his desire to pursue acting as a child. His parents believed that child actors "can get sucked into a life that isn't reality." Ludwig earned a degree in theatre at the University of Southern California where he was in the Phi Kappa Psi fraternity.

Career
Ludwig began his career at the age of nine when he featured in a Harry Potter toy commercial, a job that enabled him to sign on with an agent and obtain more commercial work. Later he was cast in movies such as Air Bud: World Pup (2000), MXP: Most Extreme Primate (2003), Scary Godmother: The Revenge of Jimmy (2005), Eve and the Fire Horse (2005), The Sandlot: Heading Home (2007).

In addition to cinema, Ludwig has also worked in television. He has performed in movies made for television, such as A Little Thing Called Murder (2006), and television series such as The Dead Zone. Ludwig obtained his leading role in The Seeker: The Dark Is Rising (2007) after a "gruelling audition process." By his count, he had 16 auditions before being cast.
Ludwig was in Grown Ups 2 with Adam Sandler.

Ludwig's next lead role came in the part of Seth – one half of a teenage, alien brother-sister duo – in the film production of Race to Witch Mountain (2009), also starring Dwayne Johnson, the wrestler-turned-actor. Seth is the part originated by Ike Eisenmann in the 1975 original, Escape to Witch Mountain. The film opened at number one at the box office the weekend that it premiered, with receipts estimated at $25 million. Despite his early casting success with The Seeker, Ludwig indicated in an interview that it was his intention to attend university. In another interview, the actor said that the most challenging thing about filming The Seeker was trying "to juggle school while filming." He stated: "My school wasn't used to it, and I wasn't used to it. It was the most amazing experience, but it was really hard."

In the movie adaptation of The Hunger Games, Ludwig played Cato, the fierce male tribute from District 2, the primary threat to the protagonists' lives during the 74th Hunger Games. The film was released worldwide on March 23, 2012. Ludwig won the award for Best Fight on 2012 MTV Movie Awards along with Jennifer Lawrence and Josh Hutcherson, as well as the award for Best Villain at the 2012 Teen Choice Awards. Ludwig released his first single "Liv It Up (Teenage Wasteland)" on March 1, 2012.

In 2013, he co-starred in the films Lone Survivor and Grown Ups 2. In 2014, he became a part of the main cast of the popular TV series Vikings, playing the character of Björn Ironside, the son of Ragnar Lothbrok and Lagertha. In 2015, he had the male lead in both the horror films Final Girl and The Final Girls, which are unrelated to each other. He played the pacifist hacker Dorn in 2020's Bad Boys for Life, and also appeared in The Band Perry's music video for "Gentle on My Mind" alongside Teen Wolf actress Shelley Hennig.

Ludwig signed with the country music label BBR Music Group/BMG in May 2021. His self-titled EP was released on May 21, 2021. On August 18, 2022, it was announced that Ludwig would appear in Nicki Minaj's music video for her single Super Freaky Girl. On August 26, 2022, Ludwig released his debut album Highway 99.

Personal life
Ludwig was a competitive freestyle skier, and has participated in skydiving.
In February 2019, Ludwig disclosed issues he experienced with depression, anxiety, alcoholism, and substance abuse starting at the age of 14.

In 2020, he married Lauren Dear.

Filmography

Film

Television

Music videos

Discography

Studio albums

Extended plays

Singles

Awards and nominations

References

External links 

 
 

20th-century Canadian male actors
21st-century Canadian male actors
21st-century Canadian male singers
1992 births
Best Actor in a Drama Series Canadian Screen Award winners
Canadian expatriate male actors in the United States
Canadian country singer-songwriters
Canadian male child actors
Canadian male film actors
Canadian male models
Canadian male television actors
Canadian male voice actors
Living people
Male actors from Vancouver
Musicians from Vancouver
USC School of Dramatic Arts alumni